Haliburton Forest & Wild Life Reserve Ltd. is a  forest in Haliburton County, Ontario. Haliburton Forest forestry operations are certified by the international Forest Stewardship Council in Canada. Haliburton Forest supports ecosystem-based research projects, primarily conducted by the University of Toronto's Faculty of Forestry, and operates year-round recreation, tourism and education programs.

History

The northern townships of Peterborough County in the British North-American Province of Upper Canada were first surveyed during the winters of 1862/63. In 1885, 10 of these townships were sold to the London-based Canadian Land and Emigration Company under the leadership of Thomas Chandler Haliburton.

The company planned on subdividing its holdings into  lots and selling them to British emigrants as farmland. Those plans were cancelled when it became obvious that the lands in question, with the exception of small parcels, were unsuitable for agriculture. The company went into receivership and was renamed the "Canadian Land and Immigration Company", with headquarters in Toronto.

From 1870 to 1910, large lumber companies acquired cutting rights and cleared most of the white pine stands.

By the 1930s, up to  remained in the hands of the Algonquin Corporation who continued harvesting timber until they were acquired by Hay and Co., a veneer milling company based in Woodstock, Ontario, in 1946. Most of this timber was cut on the land that today makes up Haliburton Forest.

By 1960, two forest inventories suggested that the harvestable volume of timber was rapidly declining on Hay and Co. lands, which had been taken over in the meantime by Weldwood of Canada. The decline through harvesting methods and volumes during the past was deemed detrimental to future production and the land was put up for sale.

In 1962, German Baron von Fuerstenberg acquired the Weldwood property and renamed his holding Haliburton Forest and Wild Life Reserve Ltd. Previously, the lakeshores of Redstone and Kennisis Lakes had been sold off to a development company. The timber rights remained with the Weldwood mill until 1967 before being turned over to the new company. A few years later, in 1970, the sawmill at Kennisis Lake closed down.

Fishing
Several of the lakes within the park are home to native brook trout and lake trout. Four lakes (Stocking Lake, Dutton, No Name Lake, Wildcat Lake) are naturally reproducing Brook Trout lakes.

There are also several bass fisheries within the forest.

Wolf Centre

The Wolf Centre opened in July 1996 to the general public and is home to a pack of five timber wolves (Canis lupus). Within the  enclosure (one of the largest in the world), they roam freely. Fed on a random schedule (approximately once a week), they can often be found near the viewing area. As this is close to both the highest point in the enclosure and the water source, they are often nearby.

Three months prior to the opening, Patricia Wyman, a new employee at the facility, was attacked by the wolves and died. Her body was found wearing nothing and featuring multiple mauling wounds.

EcoLog Homes

EcoLog Homes is a builder and supplier of log home kits. The logs they harvest come from the  privately owned Haliburton Forest & Wildlife Reserve Ltd. Mature hemlock become ready for harvesting every season, some measuring up to thirty inches in diameter. Each tree is felled and skidded by horse before being transported to the nearby Haliburton Forest Mill. Each board is squared for timbers or sawn into boards for planking.

Canopy Tour -- A Walk in the Clouds

This experience includes: a guided van tour through the private lands of Haliburton Forest and Wildlife Reserve Ltd., passing through forests and along lakes and streams; a 0.5 km walk along the scenic Pelaw River; a short, guided voyageur-canoe ride across a wilderness lake to the final destination—Canopy Boardwalk.

Snowmobiling
With  of forest wilderness, 50 lakes, and numerous ponds and creeks, Haliburton Forest is the only wholly privately owned snowmobiling operation in the world. Scenic single tracked trails access some of the remote areas within the property. Half a dozen shelter cabins, equipped with stoves and firewood, line the trail system.

Dog sledding

Introductory, half and full-day dog sledding tours are available at Haliburton Forest along groomed winter trails with over 130 Siberian Huskies. Professional guides provide introduction to the basics of dogsledding.

Mountain biking
Bikers have a choice of access roads, forest trails, or a route that covers some of the toughest terrain in the Province. The cycling season extends from Victoria Day to the weekend after Thanksgiving.

Astronomy
Due to its location three hours north of the lights of the Golden Horseshoe, Haliburton Forest is part of the Algonquin Dome, offering light-free viewing of the skies. This location allows astronomers to observe stars, galaxies and deep sky objects not normally observed in light polluted locations.

The observatory
Situated on a small rise near the entrance point into the forest, the observatory offers an unobstructed view of the night skies. Once the roof rolls off, it reveals its identity as a home for telescopes and other astronomy equipment. The ground floor is set up for presentations.

There are two 10″ and one 12″ Schmidt-Cassegrain telescopes. They are self-tracking and equipped with computerized functions accessing a 64,000-object database.

Sawmill tours

The new Haliburton Forest sawmill opened to the public in 2010. A platform overlooks the working mill, providing a view of the sawmilling processes.

The Forest Festival
The annual Forest Festival presents a mixture of the performing and visual arts within Haliburton Forest and Wild Life Reserve.

References

External links

http://www.haliburtonforestcottages.com/

Geography of Haliburton County
Forests of Ontario
Buildings and structures in Haliburton County
Tourist attractions in Haliburton County